Kala Keerthi Dr Bastian Koralage Henry Rudrigo Jayasena (born 6 July 1931 – died 11 November 2009 as Sinhala: හෙන්රි ජයසේන), popularly known as Henry Jayasena, was an actor in Sri Lankan cinema, theater and television. With a career spanning more than four decades, Jayasena is considered one of the best dramatists in Sri Lankan drama.

Personal life
He was born on 6 July 1931 in Bendiyamulla, Gampaha. He attended the Gampaha branch of Lorenz College for primary education. He then attended Nalanda College Colombo for his secondary education. During his time at the school, he was classmates with many successful people, among who were Dr. Dharmasena Attygalle, Karunaratne Abeysekera, Dr. Harischandra Wijayatunga, Dr. Hudson Silva, Hon. Rupa Karunathilake,

Jayasena was married to fellow actress Manel Ilangakoon in 1962. Manel played the lead role in Jayasena's play Kuweni and won the best actress award for her performance at the State Drama Festival. The couple has one son, Sudaraka Jayasena. Manel has acted in many popular television serials such as Ekagei Kurullo, Sathpura Wasiyo and Hiru Kumari. She died in 2004 at age 68.

Early career
Prior to acting, Jayasena began his career as an assistant teacher of English at the Dehipe Primary School in Padiyapellela in the Nuwara Eliya district in 1950. While teaching at the school, he directed his first stage play, Janaki. However, Jaysena left this post a few months later after passing the General Clerical Service Examination and securing a job with the Public Works Department (PWD) of Sri Lanka.

Before retiring from government work, he also served as Deputy Director for the National Youth Services Council in the Arts and Sports Division as well as the Sri Lanka Rupavahini Corporation in Programs Division.

Golden career
While with Public Works Department, Jaysena created many of his most famous plays, including Pawkarayo  (1958), Janelaya (1962), Kuweni (1963), Thavath Udesenak (1964), Manaranjana Wedawarjana (1965), Ahas Malilga (1966), Hunuwataye Kathawa (1967), Apata Puthey Magak Nethey (1968), Diriya Mawa (1972), Makara (1973) and Sarana Siyoth Se Puthini Habha Yana (1975).

Jaysena started his cinema career with the 1959 film Sri 296 with the role "Jayaweera". During the 1960s, Jaysena played the starring roles of "Piyal" in Gamperaliya (1964), "Azdak" in Hunuwataye Kathawa (1967) and "Lalith" in Dahasak Sithuvili (1968) and Avurududa (1986).

He also worked consistently in television series after the introduction of television to Sri Lanka in the late 1970s. Jayasena was involved with the Sri Lanka Rupavahini Corporation from its early beginnings in the 1980s. He portrayed the role of "Sudu Seeya" in the tele drama Doo Daruwo directed by Nalan Mendis and written by Dr. Somaweera Senanayaka. The serial became highly popularized and was awarded at many local television award festivals. It was the longest tele drama telecast during the 1990s in Sri Lanka.

Jayasena retired from acting in 1999 due to treatments for a terminal disease. However, he made two supporting appearances in two films, Punchi Suranganavi in 2002 and Randiya Dahara in 2004.

Selected stage plays

 Harischandra
 Janelaya'
 Thavath Udesanak Manaranjana Wedawarjana Ahas Maliga Hunuwataye Kathawa Kuweni Apata Puthe Magak Nathe Diriya Mawa Makara Sarana Siyoth Se Puthuni Haba YanaBeyond acting
Apart from acting, he also worked as a screenplay writer, lyricist and author. He contributed to the local newspaper by writing for the "Artscope page" of the Sri Lanka Daily News for many years.

Author work
 Minisun Woo Daruwo Hunuwataye Kathawa 
 Karaliyaka Kathawak Niliyakage Kathawak Nim Nethi Kathawak Balga Gilano Adarshawath Baenku Niyamuwaku A Gaman Maga Sudu Seeyage Kavi Sindu Play Is The Thing Kuweni Janelaya''

Legacy
In 2003, Jayasena was presented with Nalanda Keerthi Sri award by his school Nalanda College, Colombo.

Filmography

References

External links

Author work by Henry Jayasena
Henry Jayasena‘A gifted and decent human being….’
Henry Jayasena's overarching influence on Sinhala theatre
https://web.archive.org/web/20120523211707/http://www.sundayobserver.lk/2006/01/15/fea24.html
Azdak of Sinhala theatre leaves the stage
Drama in full flower 
Manel felicitated at 'Janakala Prasada Pranama Ulela'

1931 births
2009 deaths
Sinhalese male actors
Sri Lankan male stage actors
Sri Lankan Buddhists
Alumni of Nalanda College, Colombo
Sri Lankan dramatists and playwrights
Sri Lankan male film actors
20th-century dramatists and playwrights
Kala Keerthi